Leonardo Flores may refer to:

 Leonardo Flores (footballer, born 1995), midfielder for Caracas FC
 Leonardo Flores (footballer, born 1997), defender for Club Atlético Brown
 Monkey Black (born 1986), Dominican singer, real name Leonardo Flores